Koldihwa is an archaeological site in Uttar Pradesh, India. It is situated in the valleys of Belan River near village Devghat. Along with Mahagara, it is one of the few Neolithic sites in Uttar Pradesh. Both are in district Prayagraj. Also, Koldihwa and Mahagara, both are on the opposite banks of Belan River. Both sites are earliest examples of rice cultivation Oryza sativa. It is also the site of the finding of horse bones.

Features 
In Koldihwa, archaeologists found evidence of rice and some fragmentary bones. The site was excavated from 1972 to 1976. Remains of pottery and rice have been found to be from c. 7000 BCE according to carbon dating. In Mahagara, apart from rice, evidence of cattle domestication such as hoof marks and bones of goat, sheep, horse, deer and wild boar were found on clay surfaces symbolic of cattle pen. This is in contrast with other neolithic sites of Indian subcontinent such as Mehrgarh, Chirand and Burzahom, where evidences of wheat were found instead of rice, and other sites of southern India, like Hallur and Paiyampalli, where evidences of millet was found as chief grains.

References

Neolithic sites of Asia